German submarine U-587 was a Type VIIC U-boat built for Nazi Germany's Kriegsmarine for service during World War II.
She was laid down on 31 October 1940 by Blohm & Voss, Hamburg as yard number 563, launched on 23 July 1941 and commissioned on 11 September 1941 under Korvettenkapitän Ulrich Borcherdt.

Design
German Type VIIC submarines were preceded by the shorter Type VIIB submarines. U-587 had a displacement of  when at the surface and  while submerged. She had two shafts and two  propellers.

U-587 was fitted with five  torpedo tubes (four fitted at the bow and one at the stern), fourteen torpedoes, one  SK C/35 naval gun, 220 rounds, and a  C/30 anti-aircraft gun. The boat had a complement of between forty-four and sixty.

Service history
The boat's short service career began on 11 September 1941 with training, followed by active service on 1 January 1942 as part of the 6th U-boat Flotilla. It ended just 3 months later when she was sunk in the North Atlantic.

Wolfpacks
U-587 took part in one wolfpack, namely:
 Robbe (15 – 24 January 1942)

Fate
There were no survivors.

Summary of raiding history

References

Bibliography

External links

German Type VIIC submarines
1941 ships
U-boats commissioned in 1941
U-boats sunk in 1942
U-boats sunk by depth charges
U-boats sunk by British warships
World War II shipwrecks in the Atlantic Ocean
Ships lost with all hands
World War II submarines of Germany
Ships built in Hamburg
Maritime incidents in March 1942